Thana is a commercial center in the city of Kannur in Kerala, South India.

It is a main Commercial center and junction in NH 66 (National Highway 66) within Kannur Municipal Corporation. From this junction the highway proceeds south to Thalassery, and proceeds north towards Taliparamba. The road to east goes to Kakkad, and the road to west goes to the Kannur old City. 

Some shopping centres and private hospitals are situated around Thana. The District Ayurvada Hospital is situated very near to this junction. The headquarters of North Malabar Chamber of Commerce is also situated nearby.

Hospitals 
 Speciality Hospital
 Dhanalakshmi Hospital
 SM Hospital 
 KIMST Hospital
 Crescent
 Fathima Hospital

Schools 
 Muzhattadam Government UP School
 Government City Higher Secondary School 
 Deenul Islam Sabha Girls Higher Secondary School
 HIS English Medium School
 Dhanalakshmi College of Nursing

Photos 

Suburbs of Kannur